Clonostylis is a monotypic genus of flowering plant in the family Euphorbiaceae. The sole species is Clonostylis forbesii is a flowering tree found in Sumatra. It has small glabrous leaves with an elliptic shape, arranged spirally.

Taxonomy 
It was previously thought that Clonostylis S.Moore was a synonym of Spathiostemon Blume, but now Clonostylis is provisionally treated as a monotypic genus.

Since only one specimen has been found, according to the Nationaal Herbarium Nederland, and it did not exhibit fruit or staminate flowers, a more definite classification is not yet possible. (The species is unisexual, and the specimen in question had only pistillate flowers.)

References 

 Welzen, P.C.  van. 1998. Revisions and phylogenies of Malesian Euphorbiaceae: Subtribe Lasiococcinae (Homonoia, Lasiococca, Spathiostemon) and Clonostylis, Ricinus, and Wetria. Blumea 43: 131–164.

Acalypheae
Monotypic Euphorbiaceae genera
Endemic flora of Sumatra